Volkswagen Scirocco R-Cup was a one-make racing series by Volkswagen based in Germany, which used the Volkswagen Scirocco model. The first season was in 2010, having replaced the previous ADAC Volkswagen Polo Cup which had run since 2004. It was a support series for the Deutsche Tourenwagen Masters, and was replaced in 2015 by the Audi Sport TT Cup.

Specifications
Engine displacement:  DOHC inline-4
Gearbox: Production-based 6-speed paddle shift gearbox
Weight: 
Power output: 
Fuel: Aral Ultimate Racing 102 RON unleaded
Fuel capacity: Undisclosed
Fuel delivery: Natural gas multi-point injection 
Aspiration: Single-turbocharged
Length: 
Width: 
Wheelbase: 
Steering: Electromechanically supported rack and pinion steering

Drivers
As well as 2005 champion René Rast, a number of well-established drivers have passed through this series. These include World Touring Car Championship drivers Jaap van Lagen, Marin Colak and Jason Watt, ex-Champ Car driver Jan Heylen, 1986 Deutsche Tourenwagen Meisterschaft champion Kurt Thiim and 2009 Dakar Rally winner Giniel de Villiers. In 2010, "legend drivers" are going to be competing. So far, ex-Formula One regulars Martin Brundle and Jacques Laffite, the 1990 and 1992 World Rally Champion Carlos Sainz and five-time 24 Hours of Le Mans winner Frank Biela have all made appearances.

Scoring system
 In 2010, points were awarded to the top twenty race finishers. No points were awarded for pole position or fastest race laps. Half-points of the values listed below were awarded for the first two races of the 2010 season. All results count towards the championship.

Champions

References

External links

Volkswagen Scirocco R-Cup
ADAC Volkswagen Polo Cup at driverdb.com

 
Touring car racing series
One-make series
Auto racing series in Germany
Recurring sporting events established in 2004
Recurring events disestablished in 2014
Defunct auto racing series